Talmalmo is an Australian community in the south east part of the Riverina very close to the border with Victoria.  It is situated by road, about 21 kilometres west of Jingellic and 23 kilometres south west of Wymah.

Talmalmo Post Office opened on 18 January 1904 and closed in 1971.

Notable residents
George Fury, multiple Australian Rally Champion and Australian Touring Car Championship driver

References

External links

Towns in the Riverina
Towns in New South Wales